

Events
 Walther von der Vogelweide wrote Der Ottenton
 Bertran de Gourdon wrote two coblas on doing homage to Philip II of France
 May 6 — The troubadour Ademar Jordan was captured in battle by Simon de Montfort, 5th Earl of Leicester and never heard from again

Births
 Ibn Sahl of Seville (died 1251), Arabic language Moorish poet of Andalusia

Deaths

See also

Poetry
 List of years in poetry

13th-century poetry
Poetry

References